Baba Jani is a Pakistani drama serial that premiered on Geo Entertainment on 8 September 2018. It was written by Faiza Iftikhar, produced by Faysal Qureshi, and was directed by Ali Faizan. It stars Faysal Qureshi, Madiha Imam, Savera Nadeem, and Saba Hameed in titular roles.

Actor Faysal Qureshi had his debut as producer under his production house banner Connect Studios. The TV series did mark the second on-screen appearance of Madiha Imam and Faysal Qureshi together after Zakham.

Cast
Faysal Qureshi as Asfand
Madiha Imam as Nimra
Savera Nadeem as Sadia
Saba Hameed as Najeeba
Faryal Mehmood as Mehwish
Tipu Sharif as nasir
Jinaan Hussain as Naila
Aamir Qureshi as saqib
Mariya Khan as Rakhshanda
Adla Khan as Nabeela
Arisha Razi as Aleena
Ali Ansari as Umair
Afshan Qureshi as Fareeda
Shehryar Zaidi as Zahoor Elahi

Production
In May 2018, Faysal revealed that his next project was going to be "Baba Jani", a family drama, and that he was going to make his production debut with this serial. Ali Faizan, who previously directed serials like Khan and Piya Mann Bhaye, joined hands with him for the direction of the serial while scripts were penned down by Faiza Iftikhar.

About his character, he told The News International, "I play the role of a loyal brother who has three sisters, essayed by Saba Hameed, Jinaan Hussain, and Adla Khan. My character is a very positive one; he is a family man." He also said that his serial is an emotional roller coaster and deals with strained family relations. About the release, he said that it is going to launch on Geo Entertainment after Eid.

Broadcast and release

Broadcast
Baba Jani premiered on 8 September 2018.

Awards and nominations

References

Geo TV original programming
Urdu-language television shows
Pakistani drama television series
2018 Pakistani television series debuts